Syðradalur is a small village in the Faroe Islands. It is located on the west coast of Streymoy, in Tórshavn Municipality.

Not to be confused with Syðradalur village on Kalsoy, it has a view at the islands Koltur and Vágar.

See also
 List of towns in the Faroe Islands

References

External links
 Faroeislands.dk: Syðradalur, Streymoy Images and description of all cities on the Faroe Islands.

Populated places in the Faroe Islands
Streymoy